Ronald Erős (born 27 January 1993 in Cegléd) is a Hungarian football player. He plays for Ceglédi VSE in the Hungarian NB I.
He played his first league match in 2013.

Club statistics

Updated to games played as of 1 June 2014.

References

MLSZ

1993 births
Living people
People from Cegléd
Hungarian footballers
Association football defenders
Újpest FC players
Ceglédi VSE footballers
Nemzeti Bajnokság I players
Sportspeople from Pest County